The Waiting Room is a 2007 British romantic drama film directed by Roger Goldby and starring Anne-Marie Duff, Frank Finlay and Ralf Little. It was produced by Bright Pictures. The story follows three south London couples who try to come to terms with their love lives.

The film's running time is 102 minutes and 24 seconds.

Cast
 Anne-Marie Duff - Anna 
 Frank Finlay - Roger 
 Rupert Graves - George 
 Adrian Bower - Toby 
 Daisy Donovan - Penny 
 Ralf Little - Stephen 
 Phyllida Law - Helen 
 Zoe Telford - Jem 
 Christine Bottomley - Fiona 
 Leader Hawkins - Frank 
 Peggy Batchelor - Doris 
 Polly Rose McCarthy - Charlie 
 Elizabeth Perry - Lady with Pram 
 Lizzy McInnerny - Fiona's Mum 
 Allan Corduner - Fiona's Dad 
 Lee Williams - Brian 
 Lottie Birdsall - Football Girl 
 Kate Conway - Emily's Mum 
 Finlay Kenny Tighe - Joe 
 Paul Popplewell - Van driver 
 Natalie Danks-Smith - Laura

References

External links
 

2007 films
2000s English-language films
2007 romantic drama films
British romantic drama films
2000s British films